2022 Champions League may refer to:

Football
2021–22 UEFA Champions League
2022–23 UEFA Champions League
2022 AFC Champions League
2021–22 CAF Champions League
2022–23 CAF Champions League
2022 CONCACAF Champions League